Lil' Bush is a satirical, politically themed adult animated television series which premiered on June 13, 2007 on Comedy Central. The series features childlike caricatures of members of the George W. Bush administration, and other American and international political leaders.

The first season's episodes each consist of two story segments, with each featuring a musical performance by a band composed of main characters. The second season, which premiered on March 13, 2008, consists of ten episodes, and features the full twenty-two-minute storylines including the musical number. The second-season finale aired on May 15, 2008. Due to Barack Obama's win in the 2008 United States presidential election, it was not renewed for a third season.

Premise
Lil' Bush takes place in an alternate reality version of the present day, where George H. W. Bush is president and George W. Bush ("Lil' George" on the show), along with his cronies (members of George W. Bush's real-life former staff), are children attending Beltway Elementary School. Issues in which the latter Bush Administration is involved (for example, the Iraq War) are transferred to the elder Bush but feature the younger Bush interacting with them in various ways.

Also, just as George Bush's father is president, the parents of the other kids are members of the elder Bush's cabinet (all depicted as their real-life adult counterparts, with the exception of the elder Cheney, who is depicted as Cheney with a Darth Vader helmet). The show pokes fun at George W. Bush's policies in an indirect manner and provides a criticism of his administration.

Production
In 2004, Donick Cary created Lil' Bush for Amp'd Mobile cell phones. The show was then picked up by Comedy Central and became the first mobi/web-series ever to move from cell phones to television. To handle the animation, Cary founded Sugarshack Animation with offices in Los Angeles, Miami, and Sofia, Bulgaria, The show was animated using traditional animation in Adobe Flash.

Characters

Main characters
 Lil' Bush (George W. Bush), voiced by Chris Parson; the leader of the gang, he often makes choices without thinking about the consequences and is seldom corrected by his friends. Like the real George W. Bush, he enjoys giving people various nicknames. He doesn't seem to understand that Lil' Condi is, in fact, a girl. He has a crush on the "new girl" at school, who is the future Laura Bush. He refers to her as a "chubby nerd". Additionally, though the show is entitled Lill Bush, the character himself is always referred to by the other characters (and in the scripts) as Lil' George.
 George Sr. (George H. W. Bush), voiced by Dave B. Mitchell; the irascible Commander-in-Chief who acts as somewhat of a straight man to Lil' George. He is shown to be extremely weak physically, and possessing a deep love for Saltine crackers. He and Barbara are also swingers and although he loves his wife, he has a specific time scheduled at work for "old people sex" with his secretary. His morals seem to be completely based on voter opinions. He is also seen to be allergic to people who look Asian as seen in the 'Hall Monitor' episode (a reference to when Bush threw up onto the lap of Japan's Prime Minister).
 Barbara Bush, voiced by Mara Cary; the sexually frustrated wife of the President, so much so that she once resorts to having a tryst with Lil' Cheney. She has also admitted to having an affair with Michael Dukakis. She was confused with a polar bear in "Gay Friend". According to George Sr., Barbara Bush was a "Frankenstein of presidential parts" added with woman parts that he brought to life, giving her the head of George Washington.
 Jeb Bush, voiced by Dave B. Mitchell; the indestructible but mentally undeveloped brother to Lil' George. His family shows a general apathy towards his well-being. This could possibly be because he is able to withstand things that would kill an ordinary person, and sometimes benefits from them. In one episode, Jeb withstands a nuclear blast, and in another, climbs onto a missile about to be fired, but appears completely unharmed after the dust clears.  When Jeb is hit in the head with a frying pan, he speaks normally (then voiced by Colin Meloy) and openly criticizes his father's governmental decisions. Jeb is treated like a pet, as he is taken for walks, given flea dips, and eats from a bowl with his name on it (often next to the actual family dog Barney).
 Lil' Cheney (Dick Cheney), voiced by Donick Cary; a friend of Lil' George, he growls incoherently ("reh-reh-REH-reh!") rather than speaking, with the occasional interjection of a contextually relevant word or phrase ("reh-reh-REH-massive heart attack-reh-reh-REH"); the rest of the characters appear to understand him, much in the tradition of the mumbling Kenny McCormick on South Park. He is also an expert in foreign languages and acts as a translator for the group. As a testament to his deranged violent tendencies, he consumes raw—sometimes living—meat and blood, matched with foods high in saturated fats. His favorite food is chicken ("reh-reh-reh-Cheney snack-reh-reh-reh"). His father appears to be Darth Vader.
 Lil' Condi (Condoleezza Rice), voiced by Ann Villella in Season 1 and Kari Wahlgren in Season 2 , acts as the voice of reason for her friends (though they routinely ignore her sensible advice). She has a huge crush on Lil' George- so much so, that she does his homework for him and even gains an abundance of weight. She also takes piano lessons for her parents' amusement. In an unrelated episode, she becomes a drug addict (prescription pills) and requires the help of her friends to become clean.
 Lil' Rummy (Donald Rumsfeld), voiced by Iggy Pop; seems to be the only remotely intelligent character on the show aside from Lil' Condi. He also displays a sadistic side, possibly resulting from the fact that he is abused by his father. According to a video on Comedy Central, he is kept around as a scapegoat. This is verified in the show when George Sr. says one way to cover up a scandal is to blame it on Lil' Rummy.  This is the second cartoon series in which Donald Rumsfeld is depicted as a regular or semi-regular character, the first being Kid Notorious.

Lil' Democrats
The series antagonists (also called Lil' Dems).
 Lil' Hillary (Hillary Clinton): voiced by Kari Wahlgren (in season 2) ; girlfriend of Lil' Bill, she works at an abortion clinic after school "just for fun" and is also suggested to be bisexual after kissing Lil' Condi.
 Lil' Barack Obama: voiced by Tim Meadows; shown laughing at Lil' George, he is "nuked" by Lil' George when he is seen sneaking a cigarette outside of the White House. He also leads Lil' George's friends after Lil' Bush abandons them for Lil' Tony Blair. He attempts to enlist their help in building a "Home for Humanity" for a single mother, but the gang burns it down (assuming that the plan was to commit insurance fraud or turn it into a dungeon and force single mothers to fight to the death) and use the money to buy themselves scooters. He frequently says "Yes we can" to answer questions.
 Lil' Al Gore: voiced by Chris Parson; always encouraging others to be eco-friendly and shown with an extremely eco-friendly house with many inventions created by Lil' Al himself (including a time machine, and an interconnected series of ropes which create a net that "catches dreams", he calls the "internet"). Lil' Bush constantly ridicules him for being slightly overweight (to make everyone else think so) despite the fact that Lil' George is shown to have more bodyweight than Lil' Al.
 Lil' Nancy Pelosi: shown sewing a flag with rainbow-colored stripes, she is also "nuked" by Lil' George. Voiced by production assistant Martha Cary, who is the show creator's half-sister.
 Lil' John Kerry: voiced by Chris Parson, Lil' Kerry's voice bores Lil' Bush and the gang. He loves ketchup, and says that someday he might marry it, in reference to his real-world marriage to condiment heiress Teresa Heinz Kerry.
 Lil' John Edwards: apparently obsessed with hair in reference to Edwards' $400 haircuts.
 Lil' Bill (Bill Clinton): voiced by Chris Parson; constantly cheats on Lil' Hillary.
 Tiny Kucinich: who wants to someday fly with doves. Sometimes has to be handled like an infant. Voiced by Jason Nash, who does a variety of other voices for the show.

American politicians
 Lil' Mark Foley, voiced by Dave B. Mitchell; a member of Lil' Laura's prayer group, quite fond of texting.
 Lil' John Ashcroft; shown singing the iconic "Let the Eagle Soar", to very poor reception.
 Lil' John McCain, voiced by Dave B. Mitchell; says "That's the straight talk" at the end of almost every statement, loves chocolate milk. He disrespects Lil' Bush when he's hall monitor. Lil' Bush gets his vengeance by stoking fear of hippies in the school, then detaining John McCain in the back of a nearby Cuban restaurant as part of his anti-hippie security measures. Lil' Rummy then removes his brain with an ice cream scoop, after which he is a mindless zombie who does whatever Lil' Bush wants.
 Lil' Karl Rove, voiced by Kevin Federline. Once the most intelligent student at Beltway Elementary, he hates the Lil' Dems more than the Cronies due to their mocking of his rap styles, which only rhymes "Rove" and "trove." Lives in seclusion and eats nothing but Hot Pockets. If you require his advice, according to Lil' Rummy, "he takes over your brain for all eternity, or at least until he retires to spend more time with his kids". This is a reference to the reasons why real-life Karl Rove retired from the Bush Administration.
 The Ghosts of the Founding Fathers, later revealed to be the Lil' Dems trying to scare the gang à la Scooby-Doo - except for the headless ghost of George Washington, who tried to get his head back from Barbara Bush, then used a Quaker Oatmeal container instead. All horribly murdered by some unknown curse, they tried to teach the gang a lesson about destroying the Constitution.
 Lil' Fred Thompson, voiced by Dave B. Mitchell; an actor in the drama club.
 Lil' Rudy Giuliani, nickname is Julie, depicted as a crossdresser (in reference to the real Giuliani's guest appearance on Saturday Night Live in which he acted in drag), uses the number 9-11 often, and will do anything "to keep the terrorists from winning today."
 Lil' Mitt Romney, tends to flip-flop and tries to convert people to Mormonism.
 Lil' Tammy Duckworth, depicted as a duck in a wheelchair.
 Lil' Joe Lieberman, voiced by Dave B. Mitchell; a Jewish kid, interested in buying the White House but is ignored.
 Lil' Mike Huckabee, tried to buy the White House, also is best friends with Lil' Chuck Norris
 Lil' Katherine Harris, went on a double date to the school dance with Lil' Cheney, taking Lil' Ann Coulter and Lil' Rummy with them.
 Lil' Ralph Nader and Lil' Ron Paul, were also mentioned, but not seen; tried to buy the White House.

Others
 Lil' Laura (Laura Bush): the pudgy object of Lil' George's desire, she never speaks (though she has grunted a few times), and at one point goes to a fat camp.
 Lil' Kim Jong-il, voiced by Diane Hsu; The new student at Beltway Elementary, he antagonizes Lil' Bush, who refers to him as "Kitty", as Lil' Bush's mind processes his image as a cat. He expresses a desire to be a Hollywood-type filmmaker, even kidnapping Kevin Costner (voiced by Chris Parson) to star in his latest epic (see Shin Sang-ok). He also collects enriched uranium and is followed around by 2 large thugs named Tito and Gilligan
 Lil' Tony Blair, voiced by Dave B. Mitchell; an effeminate British boy who is on the same cheerleading squad as Lil' George. The two become friends, much to the consternation of both boys' families (Tony's mother is portrayed as the Queen). Barbara Bush uses "being British" as a euphemism for homosexuality, and she is alarmed at the possibility of Lil' George "applying for dual citizenship" and "driving on the wrong side of the road".
 Neil Bush, voiced by Donick Cary; Lil' George's hippie/druggie older brother, who he refers to as both crazy and bisexual (because Neil once brought home two Thai prostitutes and one of them was a transvestite). When Lil' George asks for help with scaring the school with hippies, Neil gives Lil' George a sheet of LSD blotter that looks like the presidential seal so he and his friends can find their inner hippie. In real life, Neil is George's younger brother by 8 years.
 Lil' Dave Grohl, voiced by himself.
 Lil' Anthony Kiedis, voiced by himself.
 Lil' Flea, voiced by himself.
 Lil' Wolf Blitzer, a caricature of Wolf Blitzer (Host of The Situation Room on CNN). Lil' Wolf Blitzer is the host of the "Situation Homeroom" on "BNN," the Beltway elementary News Network, which is most likely the morning announcements in Lil' Bush's school. In one episode, the adult Wolf Blitzer actually appears on CNN.
 Raul, voiced by Alanna Ubach; a Mexican day laborer hired by Lil' George to do his chores for him. A chemical engineer in his native Mexico, Raul has come to America because he can make more money doing manual labor for hire than he can in his chosen profession back home. Lil' George treats him as a pet and forgets to feed him as he did with all his other pets, eventually leading to his death.
 Goddy, voiced by Jeff Tweedy. He is mistaken by Lil' George for a member of ZZ Top.
 Satan, voice by Frank Black. Welcomed Lil Cheney to hell after his fatal heart attack but sent him back after Cheney's methods of running hell became too extreme for him.
 Lil' Abdullah of Saudi Arabia, voiced by Jason Mantzoukas; He and Lil' George planned Lil' 9/11 together.
 Lil' Mikey Moore (Michael Moore), voiced by Chris Parson. He made a feature documentary called "Frankfurter 9/11" about how Lil' George tortured the cafeteria staff, a reference to the Abu Ghraib scandal.
 Lil' George's Brain, voiced by Fred Schneider of The B-52's, whose helpful advice, which, though never heeded, could have helped Lil' George out of a few jams over the course of the series. Killed by Lil' George with a seven in his mind. This leaves only Lil' George's Gut (voiced by Bootsy Collins) to make decisions for him.
 King Fahd, lords his oil over the president, and likes to party. Voiced by Jason Nash.
 Drug company CEO, voiced by Phil Lesh of The Grateful Dead fame. CEO of the company Drugzall, which randomly distributes prescription drugs to the elementary school kids and causes them to act very abnormally.
 Lil' Ann Coulter, tends to turn people away from herself with her looks and collection of venereal diseases.
 Osama bin Laden, uses his followers to capture Lil' Cheney. He decides to take out his heart and transplant it into him after he was diagnosed with a weak one.
 Lil' Arnold (Arnold Schwarzenegger) is voiced by Dee Bradley Baker. He keeps Lil' George to govern Fishy and is a recurring character.
 Fishy, Lil' George's pet fish. Lil' Bush says that he calls him Fishy because he's a fish.

Episodes

Season 1 (2007-2008)

Season 2 (2008)

Critical response
The show has received negative reviews from critics, with an aggregate metascore of 31/100. A common complaint is that the show comes too late in Bush's presidency to remain topical. Other complaints accuse it of immaturity and lack of subtlety.

Not all the reviews, however, have been negative. Among others, The Hollywood Reporter gave the show a positive review. A review from About.com cited the show's "cleverness and maturity," likening it to "a less bloody South Park". Likewise, in a Netscape review, the show was credited as a political satire which "pinpoints the logical extreme of real life."

Home releases

See also
 That's My Bush!
 Our Cartoon President

References

External links
 

2000s American adult animated television series
2000s American political comedy television series
2000s American satirical television series
2007 American television series debuts
2008 American television series endings
American adult animated comedy television series
American flash adult animated television series
Animated satirical television series
Elementary school television series
English-language television shows
Comedy Central animated television series
Cultural depictions of George W. Bush
Animation based on real people
Cultural depictions of George H. W. Bush
Cultural depictions of Bill Clinton
Cultural depictions of Barack Obama
Cultural depictions of Osama bin Laden
Political satirical television series
Animated television series about children
Television series about George W. Bush